Amnesia is one of several internationally renowned clubs in Ibiza. It opened in 1976; the venue was awarded Best Global Club in 2007, 2008, 2009 and 2011 at the IDMA Awards in Miami. The club is located close to the village of San Rafael on the highway between Sant Antoni de Portmany and Ibiza Town.

History 

The origins of Amnesia are in April 1970, when the Planells family who had inhabited the house for five generations decided to move into town and sell their finca (country house) to a widow from an aristocratic background. Ibiza, which had become a destination for tourism already in the fifties, was at that time a hive for counterculture and idealists and the building that was to become Amnesia turned into a meeting point with hippie bands playing and other facets of hippie culture taking place.

In May 1976, Antonio Escohotado, a Madrid born philosopher who had arrived on the island five years earlier to start a new life, signed a lease with the landlady for use of the premises. He launched a discotheque named "El taller de los olvidadizos" ("The Workshop of the Forgetful Ones"). He wanted to express that when people go out at night it is to forget their problems and indulge in an unknown world far away from ordinary routine. However, the next day he realized that the Greek word Amnesia contains it all.

In 1978, Ginés Sánchez, a manufacturer from Madrid took over Amnesia. Unexpected closings alternated with wonderful summers with capacity crowds in active competition with the other discothèques, such as Ku (now Privilege), Pacha, Glory's and Lola's.

In the 1980s, Prontxio Izaguirre took over the running of Amnesia, and the music changed to dance music, a mix between pop and funk, and hip hop. Freestyle mixing was permitted and house was about to take over. The original Balearic Beat emerged invented by legends like DJ Alfredo Fiorito. On the night of June 22, 1991 Amnesia reopened under MFC management. It is at this time that the clubs of Ibiza began to gain international fame. In the mid nineties, Ezna Sands was instrumental in the arrival of many UK promoters and labels, including the legendary Joseph Mullen, onto the Balearic Island and into Amnesia specifically. This heralded a shift in the perception that the Island was simply a destination for 18-30 holiday makers, instead becoming the mecca for dance music enthusiasts with Amnesia and Pacha.

The club experienced expansion with the number of bars increasing from four to 16, and from a staff of 30 to more than 200 employees during the summer festivities. The staff now includes waiters, go-go dancers, security and administration staff. Nowadays the venue has a capacity of 5,000 people and is divided into two areas: Main Room and Terrace.

Since 2005, Amnesia has been run by the Cream nightclub, created and founded by Joseph Mullen from Chester in 1995, in Liverpool. Joseph Mullen sold the brand to Cream UK for £4.8 Million and retired from the music industry for personal reasons.

The club hosts Cocoon, a party by Sven Väth. The club has also hosted popular nights such as La Troya Asesina.

Awards and nominations

DJ Magazine's top 100 Clubs

International Dance Music Awards

International Nightlife Association's Top 100 Clubs

See also

List of electronic dance music venues
Privilege Ibiza

Notes

References

External links 

 

Nightclubs in Ibiza
1976 establishments in Spain
Music venues completed in 1976
Electronic dance music venues